The Permanent Representative of Israel to the United Nations is the de facto Israel Ambassador to the United Nations, with the rank and status of Ambassador Extraordinary and Plenipotentiary.

Office holders

Permanent Mission of Israel to the United Nations

The Permanent Mission of Israel to the United Nations is the diplomatic mission of the State of Israel to the United Nations in New York. As such, it reports to the Ministry of Foreign Affairs.

The Permanent Mission of Israel to the United Nations is led by Ambassador Danny Danon, who replaced Ron Prosor in 2015, as Permanent Representative of Israel to the United Nations and former Director General of the Ministry of Foreign Affairs. Danon presented his credentials to UN Deputy Secretary-General Jan Eliasson on October 19, 2015.

On May 11, 2020, Benjamin Netanyahu announced that Gilad Erdan, minister of internal security, as Israel’s new ambassador to the UN and in an unusual move, also become the ambassador to the United States after the 2020 elections.

The Deputy Permanent Representative of Israel to the United Nations is Ambassador Noa Furman.

Israel's Permanent Mission represents the State of Israel, its citizens and the Jewish people on the global stage of the United Nations. For over 65 years, Israel's delegation has worked to promote international peace, prosperity, and security through UN institutions. Today, Israeli diplomats share the unique expertise and cutting-edge innovations of the Start-up Nation in the halls of the UN to help address pressing global challenges – from public health to environmental issues to sustainable development.

In order to successfully carry out its mandate, the Permanent Mission of Israel to the United Nations has nearly 30 staff members, including diplomats from the Ministry of Foreign Affairs and civil servants. They prepare and negotiate resolutions and texts for adoption by the various UN organs.

Staff members of the Permanent Mission of Israel to the United Nations also organize visits by the Israeli authorities to the UN headquarters, notably during the general debate that opens the annual session of the UN General Assembly, which traditionally takes place in September.

See also
 Israel and the United Nations
 List of diplomatic missions of Israel
 United Nations Security Council
 United Nations General Assembly
 UN Watch

References

External links
Permanent Mission of Israel to the United Nations - About the Mission
Israel Ministry of Foreign Affairs - Diplomatic Missions Abroad: Status of relations

 
Israel
United Nations
United Nations
Israel
1949 establishments in New York City
Israel and the United Nations